Plasmodium fallax is a parasite of the genus Plasmodium subgenus Giovannolaia.

Like all Plasmodium species P. fallax has both vertebrate and insect hosts. The vertebrate hosts for this parasite are birds.

Taxonomy 

The parasite was first described by Schwetz in 1930.

Distribution 

This species is found in Uganda, Africa.

Hosts 

In Uganda a vector has been identified - the mosquito Aedes albopictus.

Among its vertebrate hosts are the pygmy owl (Glaucidium passerinum), turkeys (Meleagris species) and the helmeted guineafowl (Numida meleagris).

Plasmodium fallax has periods in which the parasite leaves its host cell and travels to find a new host cell. This is very risky because the parasite will become inactive and unable to invade a new cell if it does not quickly find a host.

References

Further reading

fallax
Parasites of birds